Rebecca Scown (born 10 August 1983) is a professional rower from New Zealand. Together with Juliette Haigh, she won the bronze medal in the women's coxless pair at the 2012 Summer Olympics. Previously they had won gold in the women's pair at the World Rowing Cup regatta in Lucerne, 2010 and at the 2010 World Rowing Championships at Lake Karapiro and the 2011 World Rowing Championships in Bled. After winning a bronze medal with the New Zealand women's eight at the 2017 World Rowing Championships, she is having a break from rowing in the 2017/18 season.

Personal life
Scown was born in Hāwera in 1983. Sonia Waddell (née Scown), a fellow competitive rower, is her cousin. Her uncle Alistair Scown (Waddell's father) is a former All Black. She completed her schooling at Wanganui Collegiate School. She participated in a number of extra-curricular activities during her schooling years, most notably rowing which she took up during her final years at Wanganui Collegiate School. Her teachers saw potential in her and allowed Scown to participate in the New Zealand Secondary Schools Rowing Regatta for Collegiate.

Scown was accepted to the University of Otago to study both Commerce and Arts and completed her Bachelor of Commerce in Marketing and Bachelor of Arts in Art History before moving north to Cambridge in the Waikato to begin her career as a full-time athlete.

Since the completion of her degree, Rebecca has also achieved a postgraduate diploma in Sport Management.

Rowing career
During her summer holidays, Scown would go home to Wanganui and compete in the Rowing New Zealand Summer season. In 2005, which was her final year at University, she received a Rowing New Zealand trial and was named a member of the New Zealand Under-23 Women's quad scull with fellow members Bess Halley, Darnelle Timbs, and Clementine Marshall. Scown and her crew mates competed at the Under-23 World Championships in Amsterdam and won a bronze medal.

In 2006, Scown rowed for the Union Boat Club in Wanganui and the Central Regional Performance Centre, gaining a number of places at the Rowing New Zealand Championships on Lake Karapiro. She was then named as a member of the New Zealand Women's Rowing Eight to compete at the 2006 World Rowing Championships in Eton, England. The crew came in 7th.

A year later, Scown competed at the 2007 World Rowing Championships in Munich, Germany as part of the New Zealand Women's Rowing Eight. However, once again, Scown and her crew returned home empty-handed as they came in 9th.

Scown was later named as the stroke of the New Zealand Women's Eight which was sent to the Rowing at the 2008 Summer Olympics – Qualification in Poznań, Poland, however, her crew was unsuccessful in their bid to qualify for the 2008 Beijing Olympic Games.

2009 provided the opportunity for her to secure a seat in the New Zealand Women's Pair. Scown was named in the boat with fellow eight-rower Emma Feathery and the pair competed at two World Rowing Cup events, winning both world cups and becoming World Rowing Cup leaders for their event in 2009. They went on to compete in the 2009 World Rowing Championships in Poznań, Poland, and found themselves in one of the closest races of the regatta; there was only 1 second within the first three crews in the race and Scown and Feathery came in third, winning the bronze.

In 2010, Juliette Haigh who was in the New Zealand Women's Pair from 2004 to 2008 returned to the event and partnered with Scown in the boat. The pair competed at two World Rowing Cup events and convincingly won both finals and the World Rowing Cup leadership jerseys, making them favourites for the 2010 World Rowing Championships to be held at Lake Karapiro in November 2010. She won a silver medal at the 2015 World Rowing Championships with the women's eight, qualifying the boat for the 2016 Olympics. She also competed in the coxless pair in Rio and with Genevieve Behrent won silver, beaten by the reigning Olympic champions Heather Stanning and Helen Glover of Great Britain. Behrent announced in November 2016 that she would take a break in 2017, hence Scown will need a new rowing partner. Scown rowed with the women's eight in 2017 and won a bronze medal at the 2017 World Rowing Championships in Sarasota, Florida. Scown will take the 2017/18 rowing season off, and will review her involvement in rowing during that time.

References

External links
Video interview with Rebecca Scown and Juliette Haigh

Living people
New Zealand female rowers
1983 births
University of Otago alumni
Sportspeople from Hāwera
Rowers from Whanganui
Rowers at the 2012 Summer Olympics
Rowers at the 2016 Summer Olympics
Olympic rowers of New Zealand
Olympic silver medalists for New Zealand
Olympic bronze medalists for New Zealand
Olympic medalists in rowing
Medalists at the 2012 Summer Olympics
Medalists at the 2016 Summer Olympics
World Rowing Championships medalists for New Zealand
People educated at Whanganui Collegiate School
Massey University alumni
21st-century New Zealand women